Michael Sweet is the first full-length solo album of Christian rock singer, and Stryper frontman, Michael Sweet. The album was released in 1994 by Benson Music Group.

The album features Gregg Fulkerson (previously with band Blue Tears) as a co-producer, songwriter, musician, and backing singer.

The album received high praise from critics as well as five No. 1 singles.

Three music videos for "All This and Heaven Too", "Someday", and "Ain't No Safe Way", were released following the album.

Track listing
All songs written by Michael Sweet, except where noted:
 "Together" (Sweet, Fulkerson) – 4:10
 "Take Me Home" – 4:41
 "Tomorrow, Tonight" – 4:36
 "All This and Heaven Too" (Sweet, Fulkerson) – 4:07
 "Someday" – 4:53
 "J.E.S.U.S." – 4:27
 "All I Wanna Do (Is Love You)" – 4:05
 "Forever Yours" (Fulkerson) – 4:24
 "I Think You Hear Me Knockin'" – 3:56
 "Ain't No Safe Way" (Sweet, Fulkerson) – 3:15

Personnel 

 Michael Sweet – lead vocals, rhythm guitar, lead guitar
 Gregg Fulkerson – rhythm guitar, organ, keyboards, background vocals, lead guitar solo on track 4
 Jamie Wollam – drums, percussion
 Michael Spears – bass guitar
 Doug Beiden – background vocals, additional organ and keyboards
 Steve Grove – saxophone on track 3
 J.R. McNeely – additional bass guitar on track 9
 Taylor Wells & Brian Ruvalcava – shouts, screams, and yells in track 6
 Carolee Fulkerson – background vocals on tracks 4 and 8

References 

Michael Sweet albums
1994 debut albums